Timothy Leonard is a former state representative from Evergreen, Colorado. A Republican, Leonard represented Colorado House of Representatives District 25, which encompasses much of  western Jefferson County, including the communities of Aspen Park, Dakota Ridge, Evergreen, Fairmount, Genesee, Idledale, Indian Hills, Kittredge, and Morrison.

Elections
On January 23, 2016, a vacancy committee appointed Leonard to the office to fill the open seat created after his predecessor resigned. He was sworn in on January 26, 2016. Running for office that same year, Leonard beat his Democratic opponent, winning 51.83% of the vote in the general election.

Legal troubles
In December 2016, Leonard served two weeks in jail for contempt of court. A judge handed down the sentence after finding he violated the terms of his 2013 divorce. The case centered on a dispute between Leonard and his ex-wife regarding who could make certain decisions regarding the education of several of the couple's six children.

References

External links
 Campaign website
 	  State House website

21st-century American politicians
Living people
Republican Party members of the Colorado House of Representatives
People from Evergreen, Colorado
Hillsdale College alumni
University of Denver alumni
Year of birth missing (living people)
Colorado politicians convicted of crimes